WSB may refer to:

Broadcasting 

 WSB (AM), a radio station (750 AM) licensed to Atlanta, Georgia, United States
 WSB-FM, a radio station (98.5 FM) licensed to Atlanta, Georgia, United States
 WSB-TV, a television station (channel 32, virtual 2) licensed to Atlanta, Georgia, United States
 WSB-TV tower
 WSBB-FM, a radio simulcast of WSB (AM) (95.5 FM) licensed to Doraville, Georgia, United States

People 

 William Seward Burroughs I, inventor of a calculating machine
 William S. Burroughs, popular writer from the Beat Generation and son of the above
 William S. Burroughs Jr., son of the above

Sports and games 

 World Series Baseball (disambiguation), a video game series published by Sega
 World Series of Boxing
 World SuperBike, another name for the Superbike World Championship

Other uses 

 r/wallstreetbets, an investing subreddit on Reddit
 Weak Stability Boundary, a low energy transfer that allows spacecraft to change orbits using very little fuel
 World Scout Bureau, a division of the World Organization of the Scout Movement
 World Security Bureau, a fictional intelligence agency on the long-running soap opera General Hospital
 WSB Universities, group of private universities in Poland
 WSB University in Dąbrowa Górnicza in Poland
 Wynental- und Suhrentalbahn, a former narrow gauge railway company in the canton of Aargau, Switzerland